Diana Pang (born 10 November 1972) is a retired Chinese dancer and actress in Hong Kong and Mainland China.

Early life 
Pang was born on 10 November 1972 in Changsha, Hunan.

She was a member of Beijing Ballet Troupe for three years (1990). Her family moved to the US in 1990, and she entered the Dance Faculty of Juilliard School, New York City to study ballet.

Career 
In the 1990s, Pang's acting career began after she moved to Mainland China and starred in a Canadian film Chinese Chocolate (1995) directed by Yan Cui. In Chinese Chocolate, Pang was Jesse, a Chinese immigrant in Canada. The film is about two Chinese women, a dancer and a doctor, and it focused on the bitter and sweet lives of sexuality of Chinese immigrants in Canada. Pang is credited as Diana Peng.

Pang then moved to Hong Kong, with her debut film being Wong Jing's 1995 The Saint of the Gamblers. She starred mostly in Category III films.

Pang's other low-budget films are Evil Instinct (1996), Hong Kong Showgirls (1996), The Imp (1996). She is now retired.

Filmography

Films
 1995 Chinese Chocolate - Jesse.
 1995 The Saint of Gamblers - Hokei
 1995 Midnight Caller - Chow Mei-Si.
 1996 Another Chinese Cop - Mindy.
 1996 Dangerous Duty - Ling Peidan.
 1996 Hong Kong Show Girls - Tai-Dan Mei-Si. 
 1996 How to Meet the Lucky Stars - Nurse
 1996 The Imp - Ching Kwok-Shan/Fun-Fun.
 1996 Midnight Express in Orient - David's Wife
 1996 The Six Devil Women - Man Nap.
Hong Kong Pie (2001)
X Imp (1999) - Aunt Fak
Hong Kong Spice Gals (1999) - The Policewoman
Brother Forever (1999) (uncredited) - Sister Nah
Loving Girl (1999)
Web of Deception (1997) - Jessica
All's Well, Ends Well 1997 (1997) - Girlfriend
Made in Heaven (1997) - Sheila
Evil Instinct (1997) - Wendy Pang

Television
 Demi-Gods and Semi-Devils (2003) - Qin Hongmian
 Amazing Detective Di Renjie (2004) - Li Qingxia
 Journey to the West (2010) - Baozhu

References

External links
 
 Diana Pang Biography
 Diana Pang Dan at hkmdb.com

 Pang Dan profile at lovehkfilm.com
 Diana Pang Dan at The HK Actor Index (brns.com)

1972 births
20th-century Chinese actresses
21st-century Chinese actresses
Actresses from Changsha
Actresses from Hunan
Chinese female dancers
Hong Kong film actresses
Hong Kong television actresses
Living people
American people of Chinese descent